Paul Francis Gorman (born August 25, 1927) is a retired United States Army general who served as Commander in Chief, United States Southern Command (USCINCSO) from 1983 to 1985.

Early life and education
Gorman was born on August 25, 1927, in Syracuse, New York.

Career
Gorman began his military service as an enlisted sailor in the United States Navy. He was appointed to the United States Military Academy, graduating in 1950.

Later work
Gorman retired with his wife Ruth to their farm, Cardinal Point, in Afton, Virginia and began raising cattle and wine grapes. He has also worked as a consultant for the Institute for Defense Analyses and the Defense Science Board, and has served on three White House commissions: the Commission on Organized Crime, the Packard Commission on Defense Management, and the Commission on Long Term Integrated Strategy. Gorman is also an assistant professor for Research in the Department of Neurosurgery, University of Virginia's Health Sciences Center, dealing with issues about information technology and health care. The Gormans have two sons and one daughter.

Awards and decorations
  Distinguished Service Cross
  Silver Star
  Legion of Merit
  Distinguished Flying Cross
  Bronze Star
  Purple Heart
  Air Medal
  Army Commendation Medal
  Combat Infantryman Badge

References

External links
 U.S. Army Combined Arms Center collection of General Gorman's papers
 Distinguished Service Cross citation

1927 births
United States Army personnel of the Vietnam War
Living people
Recipients of the Distinguished Service Cross (United States)
Recipients of the Silver Star
Recipients of the Legion of Merit
Recipients of the Air Medal
Recipients of the Distinguished Flying Cross (United States)
United States Army generals
United States Navy sailors
United States Military Academy alumni
People from Afton, Virginia